Roger Girerd was a French mass murderer who killed 10 members of his family at a farm in Charvieu-Chavagneux on May 20, 1965, before committing suicide.

The crime was reported to be the deadliest mass murder by a single person in French history at that time, even though 14 people were killed by a drunk man in Rouen on June 10, 1945.

Life
Girerd was said to have worked at a foundry from morning to evening, while his mother also urged him to do the hardest labour on the farm. Due to being overworked he had been in a mental institution in Grenoble for a few months in 1959. In the months prior to the murders he showed signs of fatigue and uttered fears of a coming nuclear war, being especially worried about the fate of his children.

Murders
According to reports, the 34-year-old stabbed his wife, Jeannette, his six children, aged 6 months to 10 years, as well as a 16 months-old niece, during the night from May 19 to May 20. The bodies of Jeannette, four of his children, and his niece were found the next day lying in the kitchen, covered with sheets, while the two remaining children were discovered on the first floor. At approximately 8:30 a.m. a witness heard two shots from the farm, and it was suspected that Girerd then killed his 58-year-old mother and his 23-year-old brother in an annex. Two more shots were heard at about 10 a.m., when Girerd killed his dog and himself.

In a suicide note, Girerd stated he was sick of living in poverty and watching his family living in need, writing:
"I have enough. I have to do something. I don't want my children to have to live the way I have to. I want everyone to live in peace. ... I am leaving money for the funeral and to pay my debts."

Victims
Jeannette Girerd, 34, Roger Girerd's wife
Eliane Girerd, 10, his daughter
Joceline Girerd, 8, his daughter
Bernard Girerd, 7, his son
Yves Girerd, 4, his son
Daniel Girerd, 2, his son
Pierre Girerd, 6 months, his son
Sylviane Girerd, 16 months, his niece
Angèle Girerd, 58, his mother
Robert Girerd, 23, his brother

References

1930s births
1965 suicides
French mass murderers
French murderers of children
Familicides
1965 murders in France
Mass murder in 1965
Suicides by firearm in France
People from Isère
Stabbing attacks in France
Mass murder in France
20th-century mass murder in France